Ottavio Scarlattini (1623 – 1699) was an Italian philosopher, mathematician and theologian.

Biography 
Ottavio Scarlattini became a Canon Regular of the Lateran at Bologna in 1639, and then he was appointed Archpriest of Villa Fontana in Medicina. Scarlattini's 1679 publication Dell'Epicuro contro gli epicurei was an 830 page treatise arguing for the beatification of Epicurus in which he defended Epicureanism as a philosophy. Translated into Latin, the work became well known across Europe. His 1683 publication L'huomo, e sue parti figurato, e simbolico, anatomico, rationale, morale, mistico, politico, e legale was a discourse on the symbolism of the parts of the human body; giving each part an anatomical, rational, moral, mystic, political, and legal analysis.

Works

Sources

1699 deaths
1623 births
17th-century Italian mathematicians
17th-century Italian philosophers
17th-century Italian Roman Catholic theologians
17th-century Italian male writers
Canons Regular of the Lateran